The gens Scutaria was an obscure plebeian family at ancient Rome.  Few members of this gens are mentioned in history, but others are known from inscriptions.

Origin
The nomen Scutarius belongs to a class of gentilicia derived from occupations; a scutarius was a shield-maker.  The family seems to have come from Venusia in Apulia, originally a Samnite town, captured during the Third Samnite War.  A Roman colony was established there in 291 BC.

Praenomina
The only praenomina found in the inscriptions of the Scutarii are Lucius and Sextus, both of which were common throughout all periods of Roman history.

Members

 Scutaria, named in a late second- or early third-century inscription from Aleria in Corsica.
 Scutarius, named in an inscription from Anicium in Gallia Aquitania.
 Lucius Scutarius, quaestor at Venusia in Apulia in 32 BC, and one of the duumviri in the following year.
 Sextus Scutarius Aethrius, built a tomb for himself and his family at Rome.
 Lucius Scutarius Andrea, dedicated an early first-century tomb at Venusia to the freedman Marcus Turellius Diomedes.
 Scutaria L. l. Epistolio, a freedwoman buried at Allifae in Campania.
 Sextus Scutarius Successus, named in a funerary inscription from Pisae in Etruria.

See also
 List of Roman gentes

References

Bibliography
 Theodor Mommsen et alii, Corpus Inscriptionum Latinarum (The Body of Latin Inscriptions, abbreviated CIL), Berlin-Brandenburgische Akademie der Wissenschaften (1853–present).
 Dictionary of Greek and Roman Geography, William Smith, ed., Little, Brown and Company, Boston (1854).
 René Cagnat et alii, L'Année épigraphique (The Year in Epigraphy, abbreviated AE), Presses Universitaires de France (1888–present).
 George Davis Chase, "The Origin of Roman Praenomina", in Harvard Studies in Classical Philology, vol. VIII, pp. 103–184 (1897).
 Paul von Rohden, Elimar Klebs, & Hermann Dessau, Prosopographia Imperii Romani (The Prosopography of the Roman Empire, abbreviated PIR), Berlin (1898).
 Ralph Van Deman Magoffin, The Quinquennales: an Historical Study, Johns Hopkins Press, Baltimore (1913).
 John C. Traupman, The New College Latin & English Dictionary, Bantam Books, New York (1995).

Roman gentes
Roman gentes of Samnite origin